Pop-Up Porno is a series of short films, directed by Canadian filmmaker Stephen Dunn and released in 2015. Each film in the series features a narrator relating their own story of an embarrassing online dating experience, as a pair of hands turns the pages through an illustrated pop-up book of the story.

Background 
The series comprises three films: "m4f", "f4m" and "m4m". The films premiered at the 2015 Sundance Film Festival, before being released online as a web series. On the films' website, Dunn has also solicited submissions from viewers to send in stories to be used as possible future installments in the series.

Accolades 
The series garnered a Canadian Screen Award nomination at the 4th Canadian Screen Awards in 2016, in the category of Original Non-Fiction Program or Series for Digital Media.

References

External links 
 
 

2015 short films
Canadian drama short films
Canadian LGBT-related short films
LGBT-related drama films
2015 LGBT-related films
Canadian LGBT-related web series
2010s Canadian LGBT-related television series
2015 drama films
2015 films
2010s English-language films
2010s Canadian films